WBI may refer to:
 Whole bowel irrigation
 Women's Basketball Invitational
 World Bank Institute
 Web-Based Instruction